The 2022 World Women's Curling Championship (branded as the 2022 BKT Tires & OK Tire World Women's Curling Championship for sponsorship reasons) was held from March 19 to 27 at the CN Centre in Prince George, British Columbia, Canada. Prince George was originally chosen to host the 2020 World Women's Curling Championship, but the event was cancelled due to the COVID-19 pandemic.

The format for the Championship returned to a 13 team round robin opposed to the 14 teams qualified for the 2021 World Women's Curling Championship. The top six teams qualified for the playoff round, where the top two teams received a bye while the remaining four played the first round.  The no-tick rule was used for the first time at a World Championship tournament.

Scotland and Japan were forced to withdraw from the tournament due to COVID-19 issues within their teams. The Russian Curling Federation was disqualified from the tournament as a sanction for the 2022 Russian invasion of Ukraine; the Czech Republic accepted an invitation to replace them. The championship was won by the Switzerland team skipped by Silvana Tirinzoni.

Qualification
Thirteen curling federations qualified to participate in the 2022 World Women's Curling Championship. This was the first World Women's Championship appearance for Turkey, who was represented by skip Dilşat Yıldız.

Russian participation
As part of international sports' reaction to the Russian invasion of Ukraine, on February 28 the World Curling Federation initiated proceedings to remove the Russian Curling Federation from the 2022 Curling Championship, pending until March 3. In its statement the WCF said:
On March 4, 2022, the WCF announced the removal of the RCF from the 2022 World Curling Championships. Their vacated spot was offered to the next best-placed teams in the World Qualifying event, first Latvia, then Finland, neither of which were able to compete. It was then offered to the next highest ranked team not already represented; the Czech Republic accepted entry into the tournament.

COVID-19 issues

Scotland 
Prior to the event, Scottish skip Rebecca Morrison and alternate Fay Henderson tested positive for COVID-19, so the team brought new alternate Beth Farmer, a shepherd from the Kinross area who was in the middle of lambing season, to play lead. However, after additional positive tests by other team members, the Scottish team was forced to withdraw from the remainder of the tournament.

Japan 
Two members of the Japanese team (third Seina Nakajima and alternate Chiaki Matsumura) did not play in their penultimate game against Switzerland due to a COVID-19 outbreak on their team, forcing them to play with three players. Despite the remaining three players on the team testing negative, the team decided to forfeit their final game against South Korea.

Teams
The teams were as follows:

WCF ranking
Year to date World Curling Federation order of merit ranking for each team prior to the event.

Rule changes
The main rule change between the 2021 and 2022 WWCC is the introduction of the no-tick rule. This will prohibit ticking a stone off of the centre line until after the fifth stone of the end has been thrown. If a stone is ticked off of the centre line before then, it is restored to its position, similar to if a stone is removed from play from the free guard zone.

Due to malfunctioning Eye on the Hog sensors in the rocks, it was decided that beginning with games on March 20, curlers would use the "honour system" to determine whether players were making hogline violations. That is, curlers would be enforcing their opposition's violations.

Round-robin standings
Final round-robin standings

Round-robin results

All draw times are listed in Pacific Time (UTC−07:00).

Draw 1
Saturday, March 19, 2:00 pm

Draw 2
Saturday, March 19, 7:00 pm

Draw 3
Sunday, March 20, 9:00 am

Draw 4
Sunday, March 20, 2:00 pm

Draw 5
Sunday, March 20, 7:00 pm

Draw 6
Monday, March 21, 9:00 am

Draw 7
Monday, March 21, 2:00 pm

Draw 8
Monday, March 21, 7:00 pm

Draw 9
Tuesday, March 22, 9:00 am

Draw 10
Tuesday, March 22, 2:00 pm

Draw 11
Tuesday, March 22, 7:00 pm

Draw 12
Wednesday, March 23, 9:00 am

Draw 13
Wednesday, March 23, 2:00 pm

Draw 14
Wednesday, March 23, 7:00 pm

Draw 15
Thursday, March 24, 9:00 am

Draw 16
Thursday, March 24, 2:00 pm

Draw 17
Thursday, March 24, 7:00 pm

Draw 18
Friday, March 25, 9:00 am

Draw 19
Friday, March 25, 2:00 pm

Draw 20
Friday, March 25, 7:00 pm

Playoffs

Qualification games
Saturday, March 26, 1:00 pm

Semifinals
Saturday, March 26, 7:00 pm

Bronze-medal game
Sunday, March 27, 11:00 am

Final
Sunday, March 27, 4:00 pm

Statistics

Top 5 player percentages
Final round robin percentages

Perfect games
Minimum 10 shots thrown

Final standings

References 

 

World Women's Curling Championship
World Women's Championship
Curling in British Columbia
2022 in British Columbia
Sports competitions in British Columbia
Women's curling competitions in Canada
2022 in women's curling
Sport in Prince George, British Columbia
World Women's Curling Championship